"Lullaby" is the sixth single released by the American synthpop band Book of Love. The song was the second single released from the band's second album Lullaby in 1988.

Although "Lullaby" failed to reach the Billboard Hot 100 chart, it became a top 30 dance club hit. The song peaked at no. 27 on the Billboard Hot Dance Club Play chart and spent seven weeks on the chart. The track, over time, has become a signature song in the band's catalogue.

The band utilized a string section of 20 Juilliard students, conducted by Michelle DiBucci, to record strings for the track, as well as bagpipes, played by a kilt wearing Roger Parsons. For the 12" single, the track was remixed into five different remixes by Justin Strauss.  The band, along with recording engineer "Doc" Dougherty, also remixed the track; titled "Lullaby (7” Version)", this remix was included on the 7-inch and cassette singles sold at retail outlets as well as the promotional CD single.

The cover art of the 12" vinyl and cassette are drawings done by lead vocalist Susan Ottaviano. The drawings are in a similar style to Amedeo Modigliani, the subject of one of their previous singles, titled "Modigliani (Lost In Your Eyes)".

While on tour in mid-2017, the band premiered a music video for the track which was later published to their official YouTube channel. The video, an animated short directed by Ronaldo Aguiar, features all new drawings by Susan Ottaviano.

Track listings

1988 7" Single   (Sire Records 7-27667)
Side A:
"Lullaby" (7" Version) - 4:05

Side B:
"Oranges And Lemons" (LP Version) - 3:32

1988 7" Promo Single   (Sire Records 7-27667-DJ)
Side A:
"Lullaby" (7" Remix) - 4:15

Side B:
"Lullaby" (7" Remix) - 4:15

1988 12" Maxi-Single (Sire Records 9 21101-0)
Side A:
"Lullaby" (Pleasant Dream Mix) - 6:56
"Lullaby" (Dream Dub) - 6:59
"Lullaby" (7" Remix) - 4:15
Side B:
"Lullaby" (Insomnia Mix) - 6:47
"Lullaby" (Dub Somnia) - 5:41
"Oranges And Lemons" - 3:32

1988 Cassette Single   (Sire Records 9 27667-4)
Side A: 
"Lullaby" (7" Version) - 4:05
Side B:
"Oranges And Lemons" - 3:32

1988 Promo CD Single   (Sire Records PRO-CD-3355)
"Lullaby" (7" Version) - 4:05
"Lullaby" (7" Remix) - 4:15
"Lullaby" (Pleasant Dream Mix) - 6:56
"Lullaby" (Insomnia Mix) - 6:47

Personnel 
"Lullaby" written by Theodore Ottaviano. "Oranges And Lemons" written by Susan Ottaviano and Ted Ottaviano. All instruments arranged, programmed, and performed by Book of Love.

 Susan Ottaviano - Lead vocals
 Ted Ottaviano - Keyboards
 Lauren Roselli - Keyboards, backing vocals
 Jade Lee - Keyboards, Percussion, backing vocals

Credits
 Produced by Flood and Ted Ottaviano
 Additional Production and Remix by Justin Strauss for JustRite Productions
 Remix Engineer: Daniel Abraham
 Additional Keyboard Programming: Eric Kupper
 Edited by Chep Nuñez
 Bagpipes by Roger Parsons
 Strings conducted by Michelle DiBucci
 Drawings by Susan Ottaviano

Charts

Official versions

" * " denotes that version is available as digital download

References

External links 
 
 

Book of Love (band) songs
1989 singles
1988 songs
Sire Records singles
Song recordings produced by Flood (producer)